The position of Boden Professor of Sanskrit at the University of Oxford was established in 1832 with money bequeathed to the university by Lieutenant Colonel Joseph Boden, a retired soldier in the service of the East India Company. He wished the university to establish a Sanskrit professorship to assist in the conversion of the people of British India to Christianity, and his bequest was also used to fund scholarships in Sanskrit at Oxford. The first two professors were elected by Oxford graduates, as the university's statutes provided: Horace Hayman Wilson won by a narrow majority in 1832, and the 1860 election was hotly contested, as the rivals each claimed to be best at fulfilling Boden's intentions and presented different views about the nature and purpose of Sanskrit scholarship. Reforms of Oxford implemented in 1882 removed all mention of Boden's original purpose from the statutes, removed the power to elect the professor from graduates, and gave the holder of the professorship a fellowship at Balliol College, Oxford.

Four of the first five professors were born in British India or had worked there. To date, Sir Monier Monier-Williams (professor 1860–99) has held the chair the longest, although a deputy was appointed to carry out his teaching duties for the last 11 years of his life. The current holder, Christopher Minkowski, was appointed in 2005 and is the eighth Boden professor. His predecessor, Richard Gombrich, has said that he had to fight to ensure that he was replaced on retirement; his view was that Oxford retained the chair in Sanskrit because it was the last such position in the United Kingdom.

In August 2022, applications for the post of Boden Professor were invited with the successful applicant taking up the post in October 2023.

Foundation

Lieutenant Colonel Joseph Boden, after whom the professorship in Sanskrit at the University of Oxford is named, served in the Bombay Native Infantry of the East India Company from 1781 until his retirement in 1807. He moved to Lisbon, Portugal, for the sake of his health, and died there on 21 November 1811. His daughter Elizabeth died in August 1827, and Boden's will provided that his estate should then pass to the University of Oxford to establish a professorship in Sanskrit.  His purpose, as set out in his will dated 15 August 1811, was to convert the people of India to Christianity "by disseminating a knowledge of the Sacred scriptures among them". Elizabeth was buried in a vault at Holy Trinity Church, Cheltenham, where a memorial stone sets out an extract from Boden's will about the bequest, and records that Boden's estate was worth about £25,000 in 1827. The university accepted Boden's bequest in November 1827, and the first professor was elected in 1832. His bequest is also used to fund the Boden Scholarship, awarded "for the encouragement of the study of, and proficiency in, the Sanskrit Language and Literature".

Elections

Election of 1832
The first and second Boden professors were chosen by Convocation (which at that time was the main governing body of the university, comprising all who had graduated with a master's degree or a doctorate).  In 1832, the voters had a choice of two candidates: Horace Hayman Wilson and William Hodge Mill. Wilson, a surgeon by training, worked in India for the East India Company and was involved in various scholarly and educational activities. Mill had been principal of Bishop’s College, Calcutta, since 1820.
Despite his abilities as a scholar, Wilson was seen by some in the university as too close to Hindu leaders to be appointed to a post which had the purpose of helping to convert India to Christianity, and his links to the theatrical world in Calcutta were considered to be disreputable.  Nevertheless, he defeated Mill by 207 votes to 200 when the election was held on 15 March 1832. Another candidate, Graves Haughton (a professor at the East India Company College), had earlier withdrawn from the election in favour of Wilson (one of his former pupils) as they had many friends in common and he did not want to split their loyalties. For his "candid and honourable conduct" throughout the election he received a written address of appreciation signed by two hundred members of the university, including professors and the heads of seven of the colleges.

Election of 1860

After Wilson's death in 1860, there was a contest between Monier Williams and Max Müller to succeed him. Williams was an Oxford-educated Englishman who had spent 14 years teaching Sanskrit to those preparing to work in British India for the East India Company. Müller was a German-born lecturer at Oxford specialising in comparative philology, the science of language. Williams laid great stress in his campaign on Boden's intention that the holder should assist in converting India through dissemination of the Christian scriptures. Müller's view was that his work was of great value to missionaries, and published testimonials accordingly, but was also a worthy end in itself. The rival campaigns took out newspaper advertisements and circulated manifestos, and different newspapers backed each man. The election came at a time of public debate about Britain's role in India particularly after the Indian Rebellion of 1857–58, in particular whether greater efforts should be made to convert India or whether to remain sensitive to local culture and traditions. Although generally regarded as superior to Williams in scholarship, Müller had the double disadvantage (in the eyes of some) of being German and having liberal Christian views. Some of the newspaper pronouncements in favour of Williams were based on a claimed national interest of having an Englishman as Boden professor to assist with the work of governing and converting India. As the religious historian Gwilym Beckerlegge has stated, "voting for the Boden Chair was increasingly taking on the appearance of being a test of patriotism." At the end of the hard-fought campaign, Williams won by a majority of over 220 votes.

Duties and regulations
The Universities of Oxford and Cambridge Act 1877 continued a process of reform imposed by Parliament that had begun in the middle of the 19th century, and empowered a group of commissioners to lay down new statutes for the university and its colleges. The commissioners' powers included the ability to rewrite trusts and directions attached to gifts that were 50 years old or more. The statutes governing the Boden chair were revised by the commissioners in 1882; there was no mention thereafter of Joseph Boden's original proselytising purpose. The professor was required to "deliver lectures and give instruction on the Sanskrit Language and Literature", to contribute towards the pursuit and advancement of knowledge, and to "aid generally the work of the University." He had to provide instruction for at least four days each week during at least twenty-one weeks each year, without further fee, to all students who had given him "reasonable notice" of attending, and to deliver public lectures. Instead of election by Convocation, the new statutes provided that the electors would be the Secretary of State for India, the Corpus Christi Professor of Comparative Philology, the Sanskrit Professor at the University of Cambridge, someone nominated by Balliol College and someone nominated by the university's governing body. Revisions by the commissioners to the statutes of Balliol College in 1882 provided that the Boden professor was to be a Fellow of the college from then onwards.

Further changes to the university's internal legislation in the 20th and early 21st centuries abolished specific statutes for the duties of, and rules for appointment to, individual chairs such as the Boden professorship. The University Council is now empowered to make appropriate arrangements for appointments and conditions of service, and the college to which any professorship is allocated (Balliol in the case of the Boden chair) has two representatives on the board of electors. In 2008, Richard Gombrich said that he had had to "fight a great battle" in 2004 to ensure that another Boden professor was appointed to succeed him on his retirement, and credited his victory to the university's realisation that it was the last chair in Sanskrit left in the United Kingdom.

List of professors

See also
List of professorships at the University of Oxford

Notes

References

Bibliography

 
 

 
Sanskrit, Boden
Lists of people associated with the University of Oxford
Balliol College, Oxford
Sanskrit, Boden
1832 establishments in England